Barry is the seventh studio album released by singer and songwriter Barry Manilow in 1980. The album reached Platinum status. The tracks were recorded at Evergreen Recording Studios in Burbank, California. Manilow co-wrote with Maurice White of Earth, Wind & Fire the album track "Only in Chicago". "We Still Have Time" was taken from the film Tribute.

The album scored one top ten pop hit, "I Made It Through the Rain", which reached number ten, in early 1981. Although "I Made It Through the Rain" was his only Top-10 on the Hot 100 from this album, he managed to reach the Top-10 on the Adult-Contemporary lists with "Lonely Together" and the bouncy up-tempo "Bermuda Triangle" was a Top-20 hit in the UK in mid-1981.
The album has yet to be released on CD in the US, but has had a CD release in Japan. It is however available as a digital download.

Track listing

Side 1 
 "Lonely Together" (Kenny Nolan) - 4:19
 "Bermuda Triangle" (music: Barry Manilow; lyrics: Bruce Sussman, Jack Feldman) - 3:45
 "I Made It Through the Rain" (music: Gerard Kenny; lyrics: Jack Feldman, Drey Shepperd, Bruce Sussman, Barry Manilow) - 4:08
 "Twenty Four Hours a Day" (music: Barry Manilow; lyrics: Marty Panzer) - 3:25
 "Dance Away" (Troy Seals, Richard Kerr) - 3:56

Side 2 
 "Life Will Go On" (music: Richard Kerr; lyrics: John Bettis) - 3:50
 "Only in Chicago" (music: Barry Manilow, Maurice White; lyrics: Barry Manilow) - 3:33
 "The Last Duet" (with Lily Tomlin) (music: Barry Manilow; lyrics: Bruce Sussman, Jack Feldman) - 3:59
 "London" (music: Barry Manilow; lyrics: Bruce Sussman, Jack Feldman) - 5:18
 "We Still Have Time (Theme from the motion picture Tribute)" (music: Barry Manilow; lyrics: Bruce Sussman, Jack Feldman) - 4:12

Personnel
Barry Manilow - vocals, keyboards, synthesizer
Dennis Belfield, Dean Parks, Jeff Mironov, John Pondel, Mitch Holder, Thom Rotella, Michael Landau, Fred Tackett - guitar
Jay Dee Maness - pedal steel guitar
Will Lee, Lou Shoch, Abraham Laboriel - bass
David Wheatley - Fender Rhodes electric piano
Robert Marullo - Fender Rhodes electric piano, synthesizer
Artie Butler, Paul Shaffer, Victor Vanacore, Bill Mays, Jerry Corbetta - keyboards
Michael Boddicker - synthesizer
Carlos Vega, Ronnie Zito, Bud Harner, Ed Greene, Ron Krasinski - drums
Alan Estes, Jimmy Maelen, Ken Park - percussion
James Jolis, Jim Haas, Jon Joyce, Kevin DiSimone, Maxine Waters, Ron Dante, Stephanie Spruill, Pat Henderson, Robin Green, Stan Farber - backing vocals
Chuck Findley - horns
Tommy Morgan - harmonica

Charts

Certifications

References 

Barry
1980 albums
Arista Records albums
Albums produced by Ron Dante